Hydrophiinae is a subfamily of venomous snakes in the family Elapidae. It contains most sea snakes and many genera of venomous land snakes found in Australasia, such as the taipans (Oxyuranus), tiger snakes (Notechis), brown snakes (Pseudonaja) and death adders (Acanthophis).

Genera 
According to the Reptile Database, Hydrophiinae contains the following 38 genera: (Sea snakes are marked with asterisks.)

References 

Elapidae
Venomous snakes